Lukas Jaun (born 29 July 1991) is a Swiss former professional cyclist, who rode for  between 2015 and 2017. In 2015, Jaun finished eighth at the Grand Prix de la ville de Nogent-sur-Oise.

References

External links

1991 births
Living people
Swiss male cyclists
People from Biel/Bienne
Cyclists at the 2015 European Games
European Games competitors for Switzerland
Sportspeople from the canton of Bern
21st-century Swiss people